The Zawawi Mosque is a mosque, located in Muscat, Oman. It was built by Omar Zawawi, a member of the Al Zawawi family, to commemorate the death of his father Abdul-Mun'im Al-Zawawi, and opened in 1985. It is notable for having the entirety of the Qur'an engraved on metal plates on its walls. There was also an older mosque by that name, built in 1906 and demolished in 2005.

See also
 List of mosques in Oman
 Qais Bin Abdul Munim Al Zawawi

References

Buildings and structures in Muscat, Oman
Mosques in Oman
Mosques completed in 1985
1985 establishments in Oman
Mosque buildings with domes